Barbara Kanam (born September 27, 1979) is a Congolese singer-songwriter, music producer and actress.

Early life and work 
Kanam was born in Bukavu, Zaire (now the Democratic Republic of the Congo).

In 1991 (the year she became involved in music) Kanam earned a Brevet de Technicien Supérieur ("Advanced Specialist") degree in international business. She started to sing with and write music for an orchestra band called Devotion but also engaged in formal musical study. Kanam developed her vocal technique at the prestigious Psalmody Academy in Johannesburg, South Africa, and concurrently received guitar lessons. In 1994, after thirteen months of music lessons, Kanam created a musical arrangement for her first tour, the "Acoustic One Woman Show," which toured Central Africa.

In 1995, Kanam settled in Abidjan, Ivory Coast, where she experimented musically by joining a religious choir. She later joined a church ensemble called the "Grace Choir" in Cocody, Ivory Coast, as a regular singer. In 1997, Kanam resumed her studies in international business.

Recording artist
In 1998, Kanam released her first album, Mokili, with producer Kone Dodo, which popularized her in the African music genre, and earned her a Kora Award nomination.

In 2003, she released her second album, Teti, which gained international recognition. She then began touring across Africa and Europe, and earned the following awards:

 2003 Kora Award | Best Actress in Johannesburg
 2004 Kunde D'Or Award  | Best female artist of Central Africa in Ouagadougou
 2004 Tamani D'Or Award | Best actress of Central Africa in Bamako

In 2005, with producer Kiki Touré and producer-arranger Edgar Yonkeu, Kanam released a cover of the song "Bibi Madeleine L'argent" (translation: "Money attracts money"), which also featured her fiancé Awilo Longomba. This song was a huge success in Africa, the Caribbean and Europe—especially France. In 2005, she gained recognition at the Black Music Awards in Cotonou, Benin, for best female video.

Her career has included numerous collaborations with artists such as Jacob Desvarieux, and Edgar Yonkeu, with whom she produced African Dance Company in 2006. In 2006, Kanam accepted an invitation to appear on Fally Ipupa's album Droit Chemin in a song entitled 100% Love. Subsequently, Ipupa contributed to a song on Kanam's album entitled Noir et Blanc.

Kanam Music 
On June 25, 2009, Kanam and Touré released a third album under the singer-songwriter's own music label, Kanam Music, entitled Karibu (meaning "Welcome" in Swahili). The album became a critical success, with journalists and broadcasters such as Claudy Siar and Yves Robert Brazza Kambala declaring it one of the best releases of 2009. Kanam became a "standard-bearer" for female African musicians.

Later in 2009, the singer received recognition at a United Nations event held at the Sebroko Hotel in Abidjan, Côte d'Ivoire. Kanam delivered a message of peace over the United Nations radio broadcast airways.

Discography

 Mokili (1999)
 Mokili Eko Leka
 Téti (2004)
Bibi Madeleine L'argent
Téti
Jardin d'Amour
Réponds-moi]
Noir & Blanc, feat Fally Ipupa
 Karibu (2009)
Dada
Djarabi
Cheri Mupenzi

References

External links
 Barbara Kanam Skyrock Music Blog
 TopVisages page

1970 births
Living people
People from Bukavu
Democratic Republic of the Congo guitarists
20th-century Democratic Republic of the Congo women singers
Democratic Republic of the Congo songwriters
Democratic Republic of the Congo emigrants to Ivory Coast
21st-century Ivorian women singers
21st-century guitarists
21st-century women guitarists